The 2011 Kelly Cup Playoffs of the ECHL started on April 4, 2011 following the end of the 2010–11 ECHL regular season. The playoff format remains unchanged from that of the 2010 postseason, with the exception of the changed conference names. 15 teams will qualify for the playoffs, being the top seven teams from the Western Conference and the top eight teams from the Eastern Conference.

Playoff format
In the Eastern Conference, postseason berths will be awarded to the first-place team in each division and the next five teams in the conference, based on points. The division winners will be seeded first, second and third and will play the eighth-place finisher, the seventh-place finisher and the sixth-place finisher, respectively, while the fourth-place finisher and the fifth-place finisher will meet. The conference semifinals will have the winner of the first-place and eighth-place matchup will meet the winner of the fourth-place and fifth-place game while the winner of the second-place and seventh-place game will face the winner of the third-place and sixth-place matchup.

In the Western Conference, postseason berths will be awarded to the first-place team in each division and the next five teams in the conference, based on points. The division winner with the best record in the conference will receive a bye in the first round. The other division winner will be seeded second and meet the team that finishes seventh in the conference in the first round. The other first round matchups will be the third-place finisher in the conference against the sixth-place finisher in the conference and the fourth-place finisher in the conference against the fifth-place finisher in the conference. The conference semifinals will have the first-place finisher meeting the winner of the fourth-place and fifth-place matchup and the winner of the second-place finisher and seventh-place finisher against the winner of the third-place finisher against the sixth-place finisher.

The first round in each Conference will be a best of five series with each subsequent round being a best of seven series.

Playoff seeds
After the regular season, 15 teams qualified for the playoffs. The Alaska Aces were the Western Conference regular season champions and the Brabham Cup winners with the best record at 97 points. The Greenville Road Warriors earned the top seed in the Eastern Conference and finished the season with 96 points.

Eastern Conference
Greenville Road Warriors - South Division and Eastern Conference champions, 96 points.
Reading Royals - Atlantic Division champions, 93 points.
Kalamazoo Wings - North Division champions, 88 points.
Wheeling Nailers - 81 points.
South Carolina Stingrays - 80 points.
Florida Everblades - 79 points.
Cincinnati Cyclones - 76 points.
Elmira Jackals - 74 points.

Western Conference
Alaska Aces - Western Conference and Mountain Division champions, Brabham Cup winner, 97 points.
Bakersfield Condors - Pacific Division champions, 86 points.
Stockton Thunder - 86 points.
Las Vegas Wranglers - 81 points.
Idaho Steelheads - 77 points.
Utah Grizzlies - 73 points.
Victoria Salmon Kings - 68 points.

Playoff bracket

Conference Quarterfinals 
Note: Home team is listed first.

Eastern Conference

(1) Greenville Road Warriors vs. (8) Elmira Jackals

(2) Reading Royals vs. (7) Cincinnati Cyclones

(3) Kalamazoo Wings vs. (6) Florida Everblades

(4) Wheeling Nailers vs. (5) South Carolina Stingrays

Western Conference

(2) Bakersfield Condors vs. (7) Victoria Salmon Kings

(3) Stockton Thunder vs. (6) Utah Grizzlies

(4) Las Vegas Wranglers vs. (5) Idaho Steelheads

Conference Semifinals 
Note: Home team is listed first.

Eastern Conference

(1) Greenville Road Warriors vs. (4) Wheeling Nailers

(2) Reading Royals vs. (3) Kalamazoo Wings

Western Conference

(1) Alaska Aces vs. (5) Idaho Steelheads

(6) Utah Grizzlies vs. (7) Victoria Salmon Kings

Conference Finals

Eastern Conference

(3) Kalamazoo Wings vs. (4) Wheeling Nailers

Western Conference

(1) Alaska Aces vs. (7) Victoria Salmon Kings

Kelly Cup Finals

(1) Alaska Aces vs.  (3) Kalamazoo Wings

Statistical leaders

Skaters

These are the top ten skaters based on points.

GP = Games played; G = Goals; A = Assists; Pts = Points; +/– = Plus/minus; PIM = Penalty minutes; Yellow shade = team still in playoffs

All statistics as of: 18:47, 23 May 2011 (UTC)

Goaltending

These are the top five goaltenders based on both goals against average and save percentage with at least one game played (Note: list is sorted by goals against average).

GP = Games played; W = Wins; L = Losses; SA = Shots against; GA = Goals against; GAA = Goals against average; SV% = Save percentage; SO = Shutouts; TOI = Time on ice (in minutes); Yellow shade = team still in playoffs

All statistics as of: 18:47, 23 May 2011 (UTC)

References

See also 
 2010–11 ECHL season
 List of ECHL seasons

Kelly Cup playoffs
2010–11 ECHL season